Elisabeth Maria Erl (born 25 May 1979) is a German singer-songwriter. She came to fame as the winner of the second season of the television show  Deutschland sucht den Superstar, the German Idol series adaptation. With DSDS, Erl appeared on the collaborative top ten single "Believe in Miracles", while her coronation song and debut single "This Is My Life" peaked at number three on the German Singles Chart and reached the top ten in Austria. Erl's pop rock–influenced debut studio album, Shout It Out (2003), reached the top forty of the German Albums Chart but was significantly less successful than previous DSDS releases.

Erl has since released three further albums, including Moving On (2007), Neue Generation (2008) and her latest effort Human (2009). While none of the singles released from these albums became major hit singles on the pop charts, songs such as "In My Dream", "Not My Type", "Get Up" and "Can't Deny It" entered the German Singles Chart. In 2005, Erl graduated in music and sports from University of Regensburg and is since working as a teacher at a secondary school in Düsseldorf. In 2011, she released the autobiography Gecastet.

Early life
Erl was born on 25 May 1979 in Straubing, Bavaria. She is the daughter of Renate and Ludwig Erl and has two brothers named Josef and Ludwig Jr. In elementary school she started learning the trumpet, piano and the guitar opposite expanding interests in tennis, cycling and skiing. In her late teenage years she became the lead singer of several soul and rock bands, including The Gong FM Band, LOP and the more popular Panta Rei. After her high school graduation at Anton-Bruckner-Gymnasium Straubing, Elli decided to become a student teacher and began studying Music and Sports at Regensburg University.

Career
In 2003, Erl participated in second season of the television show Deutschland sucht den Superstar, the German Idol series adaptation. Due to her massive stage experience, raspy voice and unconventional looks she was seen as an early favourite by the judges and also by the audience, who enabled her to sing against comrade-in-arms Denise Tillmanns during the final show in March 2004. However, in the end she beat out runner-up Tillmanns by a margin of 11 percent. Erl would remain the show's only female winner for nine years until its tenth season when Swiss singer Beatrice Egli won DSDS as the second female winner.

 Erl's coronation song and debut single "This Is My Life, written and produced by DSDS judge Dieter Bohlen, was released in March 2004 on Hansa Records and BMG. The song peaked at number three on the German Singles Chart and reached number six in Austria and number 11 in Switzerland, but was less successful than "Take Me Tonight", the first single by DSDSs first season winner Alexander Klaws. Subsequently, Erl decided not to collaborate with Bohlen on her debut album, citing personal and musical differences with the judge. She eventually released her self-composed second single "In My Dreams", but neither the single nor her debut album Shout It Out could reach the top 30 once again. As a consequence she went on tour with her band Panta Rei for some time.

In winter 2006, Erl's previously unreleased record "Better Than the Best" was chosen to become the corporate song for DHL. After her 2007 album Moving On failed to make an impact she chose to get full creative control over her subsequent work and founded her own record label 1773 Records. Erl's third album Human was released in May 2009 through 1773 and was preceded by the single "Shadows".

Private life 
Nowadays, Erl is working as a teacher at a Realschule in Düsseldorf. Her father is headmaster in a Realschule in Regenstauf in Bavaria. Erl is bisexual and prefers to have relationships with women.

Discography

Studio albums

Singles

References

External links

Official website

1979 births
Living people
Bisexual musicians
Bisexual women
Women rock singers
People from Straubing
German women guitarists
Deutschland sucht den Superstar winners
German LGBT singers
University of Regensburg alumni
21st-century German women singers
21st-century German guitarists
21st-century women guitarists